There have been three Doctor Who-themed concerts at The Proms:

Doctor Who Prom (2008)
Doctor Who Prom (2010)